Collaborator is a 2011 American drama film written and directed by Martin Donovan. The film had its world premiere on July 4, 2011, at the Karlovy Vary International Film Festival. The film stars Donovan and the two-time Emmy-nominee David Morse, with Olivia Williams, Melissa Auf der Maur, Katherine Helmond and Eileen Ryan in supporting roles

Plot
Robert Longfellow, a once-successful playwright, is taken hostage at gunpoint by an ex-con neighbor, Gus, while on a routine visit to his childhood home. Longfellow has avoided Gus since he was a boy. As the drama unfolds, social status, celebrity, politics, and the threat of violence converge, leaving the playwright simultaneously shattered and inspired.

Cast
Martin Donovan as Robert Longfellow
David Morse as Gus
Olivia Williams as Emma Stiles
Melissa Auf der Maur as Alice Longfellow
Katherine Helmond as Irene Longfellow
Eileen Ryan as Betty
Julian Richings as Maurice LeFont

Awards and nominations
 46th Karlovy Vary International Film Festival (2011)
 Best Actor — David Morse
 Award of International Film Critics (FIPRESCI)
 1st Canadian Screen Awards (2013)
 Nominated: Best Performance by an Actor in a Leading Role — David Morse

Production
DViant Films and This Is That Productions produced Collaborator. The film's score was composed by Manels Favre. The soundtrack also includes a Brahms cover performed by PJ Harvey. Filming took place in Los Angeles and Sault Ste. Marie, Ontario, Canada.

Reception
, the film has a 73% rating on Rotten Tomatoes from 26 reviews.

The New York Times found it "earnest" and "wooden", like a one-act play "in which any visceral tension is secondary to topical debates by a captor and his prisoner". The Los Angeles Times found it "disappointing" and "somber", failing to generate any tension from its thriller elements.

The Globe and Mail awarded it 2.5/5 and Adam Litovitz criticised some stagy elements but praised the film as a study of character. The New York Post praised the performances, saying "both characters are riveting".

References

External links 
 
 
 
 

2011 films
American comedy-drama films
2011 comedy-drama films
American satirical films
American independent films
Films set in California
Films set in the 2010s
Films shot in Los Angeles
Films shot in Sault Ste. Marie, Ontario
2011 directorial debut films
2011 independent films
2010s English-language films
2010s American films